is a passenger railway station located in the city of Inagi, Tokyo, Japan, operated by East Japan Railway Company (JR East).

Lines

Station layout
The station consists of two elevated island platforms, serving four tracks, connected by a footbridge. The station is staffed.

Platforms

History
The station opened on 1 November 1927. With the privatization of JNR on 1 April 1987, the station came under the control of JR East.

By 2013, all facilities were transitioned into a new elevated station.

Passenger statistics
In fiscal 2019, the station was used by an average of 8,243 passengers daily (boarding passengers only).

The passenger figures for previous years are as shown below.

Surrounding area
 Inagi Municipal Inagi 3rd Elementary School

See also
List of railway stations in Japan

References

External links

 JR East: Station information 

Stations of East Japan Railway Company
Railway stations in Tokyo
Railway stations in Japan opened in 1927
Nambu Line
Inagi, Tokyo